How Are You? is a Singapore dialect drama series which is telecast on Singapore's free-to-air channel, Mediacorp Channel 8. It stars  Michelle Yim, Zhu Houren, Chen Liping, Romeo Tan, Sheila Sim, Ya Hui, Desmond Ng, Joshua Tan, Richard Low, Roy Li & Cynthia Koh. This is the fifth dialect drama to be produced on Channel 8. This is also the first mainstream TV drama project with Zheng Geping as executive producer.

A mandarin-dubbed version of the show will aired on Astro AEC at 8.30 PM in Malaysia and Channel 8 at 9.00 PM in Singapore from 3 April 2019, which does not air the opening and ending theme songs. The original dialect version also aired on Malaysia's 8TV.

Casts

Gong Jiaqiao's family

He Xiaoxi's  family

Xiao Lang's Family

Ma Sai's Family

Other Cast

Special Appearance

Accolades

Star Awards 2021
How Are You? is nominated for 2 awards. It did not win a single award.

References

Singapore Chinese dramas
2010s Singaporean television series